The following is a comprehensive discography of Underoath, an American  rock band. They have released 8 studio albums, 3 compilations, 3 live albums, 1 video album, 15 singles, and 20 music videos. They were founded in 1999 and disbanded in early 2013 following their anthology compilation. Two of their albums have received U.S. Gold certifications and Define the Great Line debuted a No. 2 on the Billboard 200.

Albums

Studio albums

Live albums

Compilation albums

Songs

Singles

Compilation additions

Videos

Video albums

Music videos

Footnotes

References

Heavy metal group discographies
Discographies of American artists
Christian music discographies
Post-hardcore group discographies